Gary T. DiCamillo (born c. 1952) is an American businessman. He is the former chairman and chief executive officer of the Polaroid Corporation.

Early life
Gary T. DiCamillo was born circa 1952. He graduated from the Rensselaer Polytechnic Institute, where he earned a bachelor of science in chemical engineering in 1973. He earned a master in business administration from the Harvard Business School in 1975.

Career
DiCamillo began his career at Procter & Gamble. He later worked for McKinsey & Company, followed by Black & Decker. He served as the chairman and chief executive officer of the Polaroid Corporation from 1995 to 2001.

DiCamillo is a partner at Eaglepoint Advisors. He is also an adjunct lecturer at Babson College. He serves on the boards of directors of the Whirlpool Corporation and Pella.

References

Living people
1950s births
Rensselaer Polytechnic Institute alumni
Harvard Business School alumni
American chief executives
American chairpersons of corporations
American corporate directors
Babson College faculty
Polaroid Corporation
Whirlpool Corporation people